Rokometno društvo Slovan, commonly referred to as RD Slovan or simply Slovan,  is a handball club from Ljubljana, Slovenia.

Arena

RD Slovan play their home matches at Kodeljevo Sports Park, a 1,540 all-seated hall in Ljubljana.

Colours
The traditional colours of the club are red and white.

Season-by-season records

Club honours

Domestic
Yugoslav Championship
Winners (1): 1979–80

Slovenian First League
Runners-up (1): 1991–92

Slovenian Second League
Winners (2): 2012–13, 2019–20
Runners-up (2): 2004–05, 2016–17

Slovenian Handball Cup
Runners-up (2): 1992–93, 1995–96

European
European Cup
Runners-up (1): 1980–81

EHF Cup 
Quarter-finals (1): 1992–93

EHF Cup Winners' Cup
Semi-finals (1): 1983–84

References

External links
Official website 
Eurohandball profile

Handball clubs established in 1948
Slovenian handball clubs
Sports clubs in Ljubljana
1948 establishments in Slovenia